Susan Unterberg (born 1941) is an American contemporary photographer and philanthropist. Her work often focuses on themes of familial relationships and nature, and it is included in several permanent collections of major museums across the United States. In 2018, she stepped forward as the founder and funder of the Anonymous Was A Woman Award.

Life
Unterberg was born in 1941 in New York City, New York, USA. In an interview, Unterberg stated that, during her childhood, she hadn't been "encouraged to become an artist or generally to have career ambitions, [...] It was a time when women got their names in the paper when they got married or died." Despite this, Unterberg pursued her art education when her two daughters were "school-aged." She graduated from Sarah Lawrence College with a Bachelor of Fine Arts in 1977 and received a Master of Arts from New York University in 1985.

Unterberg has received various fellowships, including from the New York Foundation for the Arts in 1992 and the MacDowell Colony in 1995. In 1996, she was named a visiting artist at the American Academy in Rome.

Once a guest artist at the artist colony Yaddo, Unterberg was named as its co-chairwoman with A. M. Homes in 2013. She credited Yaddo as a place where she had worked and grown as an artist.

Unterberg lives in New York City.

Work
Unterberg usually separates her work by subject into discrete series. Her earlier work includes emotional portraits of familial relationships that explore the psychological bonds and connections between family members, while her later work consists of more abstract landscapes and portraits of animals which emphasize light, color, and metaphor. Unterberg is known for her diptych studies Mothers and Daughters and Fathers and Sons, which photographically explore family relationships.

As of 2018, Unterberg's projects involve layering photographic work in Adobe Photoshop, which she describes as "self-portraits that deal with the [current American] political situation."

Unterberg's photographic work has been exhibited at the New Museum of Contemporary Art, the International Center of Photography, the Metropolitan Museum of Art, the Jewish Museum, New York and the Los Angeles County Museum of Art.

Collections
Unterberg's work is included in the permanent collection of the Museum of Modern Art, New York, the Metropolitan Museum of Art, the Los Angeles County Museum of Art, the Jewish Museum, New York, and the Nelson-Adkins Museum of Art.

Philanthropy
In July 2018, Unterberg revealed herself as the founder and sole funder of the Anonymous Was A Woman Award. Between 1996 and 2018, she had secretly contributed $5.5 million to the fund, which was then awarded to 220 underrecognized female artists over the age of 40. This award is "an unrestricted grant of $25,000 awarded each year to ten women artists" who have reached a critical point in their careers.

Before 2018, she had remained anonymous so that her artwork would be evaluated in its own context, without being influenced by her contributions. In an interview, she described her reasons for coming forward, stating "It’s a great time for women to speak up. I feel I can be a better advocate having my own voice," and that she can now work openly to further the organization's cause and to encourage philanthropists and women artists. On top of the grant award program, Unterberg is considering other forms of programs, possibly seminars, to add balance to the organization.

Bibliography

References 

1941 births
Living people
American women photographers
American philanthropists
American contemporary artists
21st-century American women